China Horse Club is a Chinese partnership group which collectively owns racehorses. It is one of the four groups that own the 2018 Triple Crown winner Justify.

In 2018, the China Horse Club was believed to have about 200 members.

References

External links
 About the China Horse Club

Investment clubs
Clubs and societies in China
Chinese racehorse owners and breeders